Koiszków  (German:koischkau) is a village in the administrative district of Gmina Legnickie Pole, within Legnica County, Lower Silesian Voivodeship, in south-western Poland. Prior to 1945 it was in Germany. After the expulsion of Germans from Poland the German population was forced to leave the region and go to the modern day German border.

References

Villages in Legnica County